John Lund is the name of:

John Lund (actor) (1911–1992), American film actor 
John Lund (racing driver) (born 1954), British driver
John Walter Guerrier Lund (1912–2015), English phycologist
John Theodor Lund (1842–1913), Norwegian politician